Elisabetta Marchioni (also spelled Marchionni) (flourished ca. 1700) was a Venetian painter. She specialized in still life paintings of flowers. She worked in Rovigo.

Gallery

References

17th-century Italian painters
Italian women painters
People from Rovigo
Painters from Venice
17th-century Italian women artists